Pashtuns, also known as Pakhtuns or Pathans, are an Eastern Iranian ethnic group historically native to the Pashtunistan region of southern Afghanistan and northwestern Pakistan. They historically were also referred to as Afghans until the 1970s, after the term's meaning had become a demonym for members of all ethnic groups in Afghanistan.

The group's native language is Pashto, an Iranian language in the Indo-Iranian branch of the Indo-European language family. Additionally, Dari serves as the second language of Pashtuns in Afghanistan, while those in the Indian subcontinent speak Urdu and Hindi as their second language.

Pashtuns are the 26th-largest ethnic group in the world, and the largest segmentary lineage society; there are an estimated 350–400 Pashtun tribes and clans with a variety of origin theories. The total population of the Pashtun people worldwide is estimated to be around 49 million, although this figure is disputed due to the lack of an official census in Afghanistan since 1979. They are the largest ethnic group in Afghanistan and the second-largest ethnic group in Pakistan, constituting around 42 percent of the total Afghan population and around 18.24 percent of the total Pakistani population. In India, significant and historical communities of the Pashtun diaspora exist in the northern region of Rohilkhand as well as in major Indian cities such as Delhi and Mumbai. A more recent Pashtun diaspora has formed in the Arab states of the Persian Gulf (primarily in the United Arab Emirates) as part of the larger Afghan and Pakistani diaspora in that region.

Geographic distribution

Afghanistan and Pakistan

Pashtuns are found all over Afghanistan and Pakistan, especially between south of the Hindu Kush, the Indus River or around the Sulaiman Mountains. Big cities with a Pashtuns-majority include Jalalabad, Kandahar, Khost, Kohat, Lashkar Gah, Mardan, Mingora, Peshawar, Quetta, among others. Pashtuns also live in Abbottabad, Farah, Ghazni, Herat, Islamabad, Kabul, Karachi, Kunduz, Lahore, Mazar-i-Sharif, Multan, Rawalpindi, and several other cities.

The city of Karachi in Pakistan is home to the largest community of Pashtuns.

India

Pashtuns in India are often commonly referred to as Pathans (the Hindustani word for Pashtun) both by themselves and other ethnic groups of the subcontinent. Some Indians claim descent from Pashtun soldiers who settled in India by marrying local women during the Muslim conquest in the Indian subcontinent. Many Pathans chose to live in the Republic of India after the partition of India and Khan Mohammad Atif, a professor at the University of Lucknow, estimates that "The population of Pathans in India is twice their population in Afghanistan".

Historically, Pashtuns have settled in various cities of India before and during the British Raj in colonial India. These include Bombay (now called Mumbai), Delhi, Calcutta, Rohilkhand, Jaipur and Bangalore. The settlers are descended from both Pashtuns of present-day Afghanistan and Pakistan (British India before 1947). In some regions in India, they are sometimes referred to as Kabuliwala.

In India significant Pashtun diaspora communities exist. While speakers of Pashto in the country only number 21,677 as of 2011, estimates of the ethnic or ancestral Pashtun population in India range from 3,200,000 to 11,482,000 to as high as double their population in Afghanistan (approximately 30 million).

The Rohilkhand region of Uttar Pradesh is named after the Rohilla community of Pashtun ancestry. They also live in the states of Maharashtra in central India and West Bengal in eastern India that each have a population of over a million with Pashtun ancestry; both Bombay and Calcutta were primary locations of Pashtun migrants from Afghanistan during the colonial era. There are also populations over 100,000 each in the cities of Jaipur in Rajasthan and Bangalore in Karnataka. Bombay (now called Mumbai) and Calcutta both have a Pashtun population of over 1 million, whilst Jaipur and Bangalore have an estimate of around 100,000. The Pashtuns in Bangalore include the khan siblings Feroz, Sanjay and Akbar Khan, whose father settled in Bangalore from Ghazni.

During the 19th century, when the British were accepting peasants from British India as indentured servants to work in the Caribbean, South Africa and other far away places, Rohillas who had lost their empire and were unemployed and restless, were sent to places as far as Trinidad, Surinam, Guyana, and Fiji, to work with other Indians on the sugarcane fields and perform manual labour. Many of these immigrants stayed there and formed unique communities of their own. Some of them assimilated with the other South Asian Muslim nationalities to form a common Indian Muslim community in tandem with the larger Indian community, losing their distinctive heritage. Some Pashtuns travelled to as far away as Australia during the same era.

Today, the Pashtuns are a collection of diversely scattered communities present across the length and breadth of India, with the largest populations principally settled in the plains of northern and central India. Following the partition of India in 1947, many of them migrated to Pakistan. The majority of Indian Pashtuns are Urdu-speaking communities, who have assimilated into the local society over the course of generations. Pashtuns have influenced and contributed to various fields in India, particularly politics, the entertainment industry and sports.

Iran 
Pashtuns are also found in smaller numbers in the eastern and northern parts of Iran. Records as early as the mid-1600s report Durrani Pashtuns living in the Khorasan Province of Safavid Iran. After the short reign of the Ghilji Pashtuns in Iran, Nader Shah defeated the last independent Ghilji ruler of Kandahar, Hussain Hotak. In order to secure Durrani control in southern Afghanistan, Nader Shah deported Hussain Hotak and large numbers of the Ghilji Pashtuns to the Mazandaran Province in northern Iran. The remnants of this once sizable exiled community, although assimilated, continue to claim Pashtun descent. During the early 18th century, in the course of a very few years, the number of Durrani Pashtuns in Iranian Khorasan, greatly increased. Later the region became part of the Durrani Empire itself. The second Durrani king of Afghanistan, Timur Shah Durrani was born in Mashhad. Contemporary to Durrani rule in the east, Azad Khan Afghan, an ethnic Ghilji Pashtun, formerly second in charge of Azerbaijan during Afsharid rule, gained power in the western regions of Iran and Azerbaijan for a short period. According to a sample survey in 1988, 75 percent of all Afghan refugees in the southern part of the Iranian Khorasan Province were Durrani Pashtuns.

In other regions

Indian and Pakistani Pashtuns have utilised the British/Commonwealth links of their respective countries, and modern communities have been established starting around the 1960s mainly in the United Kingdom, Canada, Australia but also in other commonwealth countries (and the United States). Some Pashtuns have also settled in the Middle East, such as in the Arabian Peninsula. For example, about 300,000 Pashtuns migrated to the Persian Gulf countries between 1976 and 1981, representing 35% of Pakistani immigrants. The Pakistani and Afghan diaspora around the world includes Pashtuns.

Etymology

Ancient historical references: Pashtun 

A tribe called Pakthās, one of the tribes that fought against Sudas in the Dasarajna, or "Battle of the Ten Kings", are mentioned in the seventh mandala of the Rigveda, a text of Vedic Sanskrit hymns dated between  1500 and 1200 BCE:

Heinrich Zimmer connects them with a tribe mentioned by Herodotus (Pactyans) in 430 BCE in the Histories:

These Pactyans lived on the eastern frontier of the Achaemenid Arachosia Satrapy as early as the 1st millennium BCE, present day Afghanistan. Herodotus also mentions a tribe of known as Aparytai (Ἀπαρύται). Thomas Holdich has linked them with the Afridi tribe:

Joseph Marquart made the connection of the Pashtuns with names such as the Parsiētai (Παρσιῆται), Parsioi (Πάρσιοι) that were cited by Ptolemy 150 CE:

Strabo, the Greek geographer, in the Geographica (written between 43 BC to 23 AD) makes mention of the Scythian tribe Pasiani (Πασιανοί), which has also been identified with Pashtuns given that Pashto is an Eastern-Iranian language, much like the Scythian languages:

This is considered a different rendering of Ptolemy's Parsioi (Πάρσιοι). Johnny Cheung, reflecting on Ptolemy's Parsioi (Πάρσιοι) and Strabo's Pasiani (Πασιανοί) states: "Both forms show slight phonetic substitutions, viz. of υ for ι, and the loss of r in Pasianoi is due to perseveration from the preceding Asianoi. They are therefore the most likely candidates as the (linguistic) ancestors of modern day Pashtuns."

Middle historical references: Afghan 

In the Middle Ages until the advent of modern Afghanistan in the 18th century, the Pashtuns were often referred to as "Afghans".
The etymological view supported by numerous noted scholars is that the name Afghan evidently derives from Sanskrit Aśvakan, or the Assakenoi of Arrian, which was the name used for ancient inhabitants of the Hindu Kush. Aśvakan literally means "horsemen", "horse breeders", or "cavalrymen" (from aśva or aspa, the Sanskrit and Avestan words for "horse"). This view was propounded by scholars like Christian Lassen, J. W. McCrindle, M. V. de Saint Martin, and É. Reclus,

The earliest mention of the name Afghan (Abgân) is by Shapur I of the Sassanid Empire during the 3rd century CE, In the 4th century the word "Afghans/Afghana" (αβγανανο) as a reference to a particular people is mentioned in the Bactrian documents found in Northern Afghanistan.

The name Afghan is later recorded in the 6th century CE in the form of "Avagāṇa" [अवगाण] by the Indian astronomer Varāha Mihira in his Brihat-samhita.

The word Afghan has also appeared in the 982 Ḥudūd al-ʿĀlam, where a reference is made to a village, Saul, which was probably located near Gardez, Afghanistan.
 The same book also speaks of a king in Ninhar (Nangarhar), who had Muslim, Afghan and Hindu wives. In the 11th century, Afghans are mentioned in Al-Biruni's Tarikh-ul Hind ("History of the Indus"), which describes groups of rebellious Afghans in the tribal lands west of the Indus River in what is today Pakistan.

Al-Utbi, the Ghaznavid chronicler, in his Tarikh-i Yamini recorded that many Afghans and Khiljis (possibly the modern Ghilji) enlisted in the army of Sabuktigin after Jayapala was defeated. Al-Utbi further stated that Afghans and Ghiljis made a part of Mahmud Ghaznavi's army and were sent on his expedition to Tocharistan, while on another occasion Mahmud Ghaznavi attacked and punished a group of opposing Afghans, as also corroborated by Abulfazl Beyhaqi. It is recorded that Afghans were also enrolled in the Ghurid Kingdom (1148–1215). By the beginning of the Khilji dynasty in 1290, Afghans have been well known in northern India.

Ibn Battuta, when visiting Afghanistan following the era of the Khilji dynasty, also wrote about the Afghans.

Ferishta, a 16th-century Muslim historian writing about the history of Muslim rule in the subcontinent, stated:

History and origins 

The ethnogenesis of the Pashtun ethnic group is unclear but historians have come across references to various ancient peoples called Pakthas (Pactyans) between the 2nd and the 1st millennium BC, who may be their early ancestors, and old Iranian tribes that spread throughout the eastern Iranian plateau. However, there are many conflicting theories amongst historians and the Pashtuns themselves.

Mohan Lal stated in 1846 that "the origin of the Afghans is so obscure, that no one, even among the oldest and most clever of the tribe, can give satisfactory information on this point." Others have suggested that that a single origin of the Pashtuns is unlikely but rather they are a tribal confederation.

Linguistic origin 

Pashto is generally classified as an Eastern Iranian language. It shares features with the Munji language, which is the closest existing language to the extinct Bactrian, but also shares features with the Sogdian language, as well as Khwarezmian, Shughni, Sanglechi, and Khotanese Saka.

It is suggested by some that Pashto may have originated in the Badakhshan region and is connected to a Saka language akin to Khotanese. In fact major linguist Georg Morgenstierne has described Pashto as a Saka dialect and many others have observed the similarities between Pashto and other Saka languages as well, suggesting that the original Pashto speakers might have been a Saka group. Furthemore Pashto and Ossetian, another Scythian-descending language, share cognates in their vocabulary which other Eastern Iranian languages lack Cheung suggests a common isogloss between Pashto and Ossetian which he explains by an undocumented Saka dialect being spoken close to reconstructed Old Pashto which was likely spoken north of the Oxus at that time. Others however have suggested a much older Iranic ancestor given the affinity to Old Avestan.

Hephthalite (White Hun) theory 
Yu. V. Gankovsky, a Soviet historian proposes an Ephthalite origin for the Pashtuns:

According to Georg Morgenstierne, the Durrani tribe who were known as the "Abdali" before the formation of the Durrani Empire 1747, might be connected to with the Hephthalites; Aydogdy Kurbanov endorses this view who proposes that after the collapse of the Hephthalite confederacy, Hephthalite likely assimilated into different local populations.

Others draw different conclusions. Ghilji tribe has been connected to the Khalaj people. Following al-Khwarizmi, Josef Markwart claimed the Khalaj to be remnants of the Hephthalite confederacy. The Hephthalites may have been Indo-Iranian, although the view that they were of Turkic Gaoju origin "seems to be most prominent at present". The Khalaj may originally have been Turkic-speaking and only federated with Iranian Pashto-speaking tribes in Medieval times.

However, according to linguist Sims-Williams, archaeological documents do not support the suggestion that the Khalaj were the successors of the Hephthalites, while according to historian V. Minorsky, the Khalaj were "perhaps only politically associated with the Hephthalites."

Anthropology and oral traditions

Theory of Pashtun descent from Israelites

Some anthropologists lend credence to the oral traditions of the Pashtun tribes themselves. For example, according to the Encyclopaedia of Islam, the theory of Pashtun descent from Israelites is traced to Nimat Allah al-Harawi, who compiled a history for Khan-e-Jehan Lodhi in the reign of Mughal Emperor Jehangir in the 17th century. The 13th century Tabaqat-i Nasiri discusses the settlement of immigrant Bani Israel at the end of the 8th century CE in the Ghor region of Afghanistan, settlement attested by Jewish inscriptions in Ghor. Historian André Wink suggests that the story "may contain a clue to the remarkable theory of the Jewish origin of some of the Afghan tribes which is persistently advocated in the Persian-Afghan chronicles." These references to Bani Israel agree with the commonly held view by Pashtuns that when the twelve tribes of Israel were dispersed, the tribe of Joseph, among other Hebrew tribes, settled in the Afghanistan region. This oral tradition is widespread among the Pashtun tribes. There have been many legends over the centuries of descent from the Ten Lost Tribes after groups converted to Christianity and Islam. Hence the tribal name Yusufzai in Pashto translates to the "son of Joseph". A similar story is told by many historians, including the 14th century Ibn Battuta and 16th century Ferishta. However, the similarity of names can also be traced to the presence of Arabic through Islam.

One conflicting issue in the belief that the Pashtuns descend from the Israelites is that the Ten Lost Tribes were exiled by the ruler of Assyria, while Maghzan-e-Afghani says they were permitted by the ruler to go east to Afghanistan. This inconsistency can be explained by the fact that Persia acquired the lands of the ancient Assyrian Empire when it conquered the Empire of the Medes and Chaldean Babylonia, which had conquered Assyria decades earlier. But no ancient author mentions such a transfer of Israelites further east, or no ancient extra-Biblical texts refer to the Ten Lost Tribes at all.

Some Afghan historians have maintained that Pashtuns are linked to the ancient Israelites. Mohan Lal quoted Mountstuart Elphinstone who wrote:

This theory has been criticised by not being substantiated by historical evidence. Dr. Zaman Stanizai criticises this theory:

According to genetic studies Pashtuns have a greater R1a1a*-M198 modal halogroup than Jews:

Other theories of descent 
Some Pashtun tribes claim descent from Arabs, including some claiming to be Sayyids. Some groups from Peshawar and Kandahar believe to be descended from Greeks who arrived with Alexander the Great. According to Firasat et al. 2007, only a small proportion of Pashtuns may descend from Greeks, but they also suggest that Greek ancestry may also have come from Greek slaves brought by Xerxes I.

One historical account connects the Pashtuns to a possible Ancient Egyptian past but this lacks supporting evidence.

Henry Walter Bellew (1864) was of the view that the Pashtuns likely have mixed Greek and Rajput roots. Following Alexander's brief occupation, the successor state of the Seleucid Empire expanded influence on the Pashtuns until 305 BCE when they gave up dominating power to the Indian Maurya Empire as part of an alliance treaty.

Modern era 

Their modern past stretches back to the Delhi Sultanate (Khalji and Lodi dynasty), the Hotak dynasty and the Durrani Empire. The Hotak rulers rebelled against the Safavids and seized control over much of Persia from 1722 to 1729. This was followed by the conquests of Ahmad Shah Durrani who was a former high-ranking military commander under Nader Shah and founder of the Durrani Empire, which covered most of what is now Afghanistan, Pakistan, Kashmir, Indian Punjab, as well as the Kohistan and Khorasan provinces of Iran. After the decline of the Durrani dynasty in the first half of the 19th century under Shuja Shah Durrani, the Barakzai dynasty took control of the empire. Specifically, the Mohamedzais held Afghanistan's monarchy from around 1826 to the end of Zahir Shah's reign in 1973.
The Pashtuns in Afghanistan resisted British designs upon their territory and kept the Russians at bay during the so-called "Great Game". By playing the two super powers against each other, Afghanistan remained an independent sovereign state and maintained some autonomy (see the Siege of Malakand). During the reign of Abdur Rahman Khan (1880–1901), Pashtun regions were politically divided by the Durand Line, and what is today western Pakistan fell within British India as a result of the border. In the 20th century, many politically active Pashtun leaders living under British rule of undivided India supported Indian independence, including Ashfaqulla Khan, Abdul Samad Khan Achakzai, Ajmal Khattak, Bacha Khan and his son Wali Khan (both members of the Khudai Khidmatgar), and were inspired by Mohandas Gandhi's non-violent method of resistance. Many Pashtuns also worked in the Muslim League to fight for an independent Pakistan through non violent resistance, including Yusuf Khattak and Abdur Rab Nishtar who was a close associate of Muhammad Ali Jinnah.

The Pashtuns of Afghanistan attained complete independence from British political intervention during the reign of Amanullah Khan, following the Third Anglo-Afghan War. By the 1950s a popular call for Pashtunistan began to be heard in Afghanistan and the new state of Pakistan. This led to bad relations between the two nations. The Afghan monarchy ended when President Daoud Khan seized control of Afghanistan from his cousin Zahir Shah in 1973, which opened doors for a proxy war by neighbors and the rise of Marxism. In April 1978, Daoud Khan was assassinated along with his family and relatives. Afghan mujahideen commanders began being recruited in neighboring Pakistan for a guerrilla warfare against the Democratic Republic of Afghanistan - the Marxist government was also dominated by Pashtun Khalqists. In 1979, the Soviet Union invaded its southern neighbor Afghanistan in order to defeat a rising insurgency. The Afghan mujahideen were funded by the United States, Saudi Arabia, China and others, and included some Pashtun commanders such as Abdul Rasul Sayyaf, Gulbuddin Hekmatyar, Jalaluddin Haqqani, Mohammad Nabi Mohammadi and Mohammad Yunus Khalis. In the meantime, millions of Pashtuns joined the Afghan diaspora in Pakistan and Iran, and from there tens of thousands proceeded to Europe, North America, Oceania and other parts of the world.

Many high-ranking government officials in the Islamic Republic of Afghanistan were Pashtuns, including: Abdul Rahim Wardak, Abdul Salam Azimi, Anwar ul-Haq Ahady, Amirzai Sangin, Ghulam Farooq Wardak, Hamid Karzai, Mohammad Ishaq Aloko, Omar Zakhilwal, Sher Mohammad Karimi, Zalmay Rasoul,  Yousef Pashtun. The list of current governors of Afghanistan also include large percentage of Pashtuns. Mullah Yaqoob serves as acting Defense Minister, Sirajuddin Haqqani as acting Interior Minister, Amir Khan Muttaqi as acting Foreign Minister, Gul Agha Ishakzai as acting Finance Minister, and Hasan Akhund as acting Prime Minister. A number of other ministers are also Pashtuns.

The Afghan royal family, which was represented by King Zahir Shah, are referred to Mohammadzais. Other prominent Pashtuns include the 17th-century poets Khushal Khan Khattak and Rahman Baba, and in contemporary era Afghan Astronaut Abdul Ahad Mohmand, former U.S. Ambassador Zalmay Khalilzad, and Ashraf Ghani among many others.

Many Pashtuns of Pakistan and India have adopted non-Pashtun cultures, mainly by abandoning Pashto and using languages such as Urdu, Punjabi, and Hindko. These include Ghulam Mohammad (first Finance Minister, from 1947 to 1951, and third Governor-General of Pakistan, from 1951 to 1955), Ayub Khan, who was the second President of Pakistan, Zakir Husain who was the third President of India and Abdul Qadeer Khan, father of Pakistan's nuclear weapons program.

Many more held high government posts, such as Fazal-ur-Rehman, Asfandyar Wali Khan, Mahmood Khan Achakzai, Sirajul Haq, and Aftab Ahmad Sherpao, who are presidents of their respective political parties in Pakistan. Others became famous in sports (e.g., Imran Khan, Mansoor Ali Khan Pataudi, Younis Khan, Shahid Afridi, Irfan Pathan, Jahangir Khan, Jansher Khan, Hashim Khan, Rashid Khan, Shaheen Afridi, Naseem Shah, Misbah Ul Haq, Mujeeb Ur Rahman and Mohammad Wasim) and literature (e.g., Ghani Khan, Hamza Shinwari, and Kabir Stori). Malala Yousafzai, who became the youngest Nobel Peace Prize recipient in 2014, is a Pakistani Pashtun.

Many of the Bollywood film stars in India have Pashtun ancestry; some of the most notable ones are Aamir Khan, Shahrukh Khan, Salman Khan, Feroz Khan, Madhubala, Kader Khan, Saif Ali Khan, Soha Ali Khan, Sara Ali Khan, and Zarine Khan. In addition, one of India's former presidents, Zakir Hussain, belonged to the Afridi tribe. Mohammad Yunus, India's former ambassador to Algeria and advisor to Indira Gandhi, is of Pashtun origin and related to the legendary Bacha Khan.

In the late 1990s, Pashtuns were the primary ethnic group in the ruling regime i.e Islamic Emirate of Afghanistan (Taliban regime). The Northern Alliance that was fighting against the Taliban also included a number of Pashtuns. Among them were Abdullah Abdullah, Abdul Qadir and his brother Abdul Haq, Abdul Rasul Sayyaf, Asadullah Khalid, Hamid Karzai and Gul Agha Sherzai. The Taliban regime was ousted in late 2001 during the US-led War in Afghanistan and replaced by the Karzai administration. This was followed by the Ghani administration and the reconquest of Afghanistan by the Taliban (Islamic Emirate of Afghanistan).

The long wars in Afghanistan have led to Pashtuns gaining a reputation for being exceptional fighters. Some activists and intellectuals are trying to rebuild Pashtun intellectualism and its pre-war culture.

Genetics 
According to a study from 2012 called "Afghanistan from a Y-chromosome perspective", the study from a sample size of 190 showed R1a1a-M198 to be the most dominant haplogroup in Pashtuns at 67.4%. In the north, it peaks at 50% while in the south, it peaks at 65.8%. R1a-Z2125 occurs at a frequency of 40% in Pashtuns from Northern Afghanistan. This subclade is also predominantly present among Tajik, Turkmen, Uzbek, and Bashkir ethnic groups, as well as in some populations in the Caucasus and Iran.

Haplogroup G-M201 reaches 14.7% in Afghan Pashtuns and is the second most frequent haplogroup in Pashtuns from southern Afghanistan. It is virtually absent from all other Afghan populations. This haplogroup is reported at high frequencies in the Caucasus and is thought to be associated with the Neolithic expansion throughout the region.

Haplogroup L-M20 exhibits substantial disparity in its distribution on either side of the Hindu Kush range, with 25% of Pashtuns from northern Afghanistan belonging to this lineage, compared with only 4.8% of males from the south. Paragroup L3*-M357 accounts for the majority of L-M20 chromosomes among Afghan Pashtuns in both the north and south.

According to a Mitochondrial DNA analysis of four ethnic groups of Afghanistan, the majority of mtDNA among Afghan Pashtuns belongs to West Eurasian lineages, and share a greater affinity with West Eurasian and Central Asian populations rather than to populations of South Asia or East Asia. The haplogroup analysis indicates the Pashtuns and Tajiks share some sort of ancestral heritage. The study also states that among the studied ethnic groups, the Pashtuns have the greatest HVS-I sequence diversity.

Definitions
The most prominent views amongst Pashtuns as to who exactly qualifies as a Pashtun are:
 Those who use Pashto as their first language. The Pashto language is "one of the primary markers of ethnic identity" amongst Pashtuns.
 Adherence to the code of Pashtunwali. The cultural definition requires Pashtuns to adhere to Pashtunwali codes.
 Belonging to a Pashtun tribe through patrilineal descent, based on an important orthodox law of Pashtunwali which mainly requires that only those who have a Pashtun father are Pashtun. This definition places less emphasis on the language.

Tribes 

A prominent institution of the Pashtun people is the intricate system of tribes. The tribal system has several levels of organisation: the tribe they are in is from four 'greater' tribal groups: the Sarbani, the Bettani, the Gharghashti, and the Karlani. The tribe is then divided into kinship groups called khels, which in turn is divided into smaller groups (pllarina or plarganey), each consisting of several extended families called kahols.

Durrani and Ghilji Pashtuns
The Durranis and Ghiljis (or Ghilzais) are the two largest groups of Pashtuns, with approximately two-thirds of Afghan Pashtuns belonging to these confederations. The Durrani tribe has been more urban and politically successful, while the Ghiljis are more numerous, more rural, and reputedly tougher. In the 18th century, the groups collaborated at times and at other times fought each other. With a few gaps, Durranis ruled modern Afghanistan continuously until the Saur Revolution of 1978; the new communist rulers were Ghilji.

Tribal allegiances are stronger among the Ghilji, while governance of the Durrani confederation is more to do with cross-tribal structures of land ownership.

Language 

Pashto is the mother tongue of most Pashtuns. It is one of the two national languages of Afghanistan. In Pakistan, although being the second-largest language being spoken, it is often neglected officially in the education system. This has been criticised as adversely impacting the economic advancement of Pashtuns, as students do not have the ability to comprehend what is being taught in other languages fully. Robert Nichols remarks:

Pashto is categorised as an Eastern Iranian language, but a remarkably large number of words are unique to Pashto. Pashto morphology in relation to verbs is complex compared to other Iranian languages. In this respect MacKenzie states:

Pashto has a large number of dialects: generally divided into Northern, Southern and Central groups; and also Tarino or Waṇetsi as distinct group. As Elfenbein notes: "Dialect differences lie primarily in phonology and lexicon: the morphology and syntax are, again with the exception of Wanetsi, quite remarkably uniform". Ibrahim Khan provides the following classification on the letter ښ: the Northern Western dialect (e.g. spoken by the Ghilzai) having the phonetic value , the North Eastern (spoken by the Yusafzais etc.) having the sound , the South Western (spoken by the Abdalis etc.) having  and the South Eastern (spoken by the Kakars etc.) having . He illustrates that the Central dialects, which are spoken by the Karlāṇ tribes, can also be divided on the North  and South  distinction but provides that in addition these Central dialects have had a vowel shift which makes them distinct: for instance  represented by aleph the non-Central dialects becoming  in Banisi dialect.

The first Pashto alphabet was developed by Pir Roshan in the 16th century. In 1958, a meeting of Pashtun scholars and writers from both Afghanistan and Pakistan, held in Kabul, standardised the present Pashto alphabet.

Culture 

Pashtun culture is based on Pashtunwali, Islam and the understanding of Pashto language. The Kabul dialect is used to standardize the present Pashto alphabet. Poetry is also an important part of Pashtun culture and it has been for centuries. Pre-Islamic traditions, dating back to Alexander's defeat of the Persian Empire in 330 BC, possibly survived in the form of traditional dances, while literary styles and music reflect influence from the Persian tradition and regional musical instruments fused with localised variants and interpretation. Like other Muslims, Pashtuns celebrate Islamic holidays. Contrary to the Pashtuns living in Pakistan, Nowruz in Afghanistan is celebrated as the Afghan New Year by all Afghan ethnicities.

Pashtunwali 

Pashtunwali refers to an ancient self-governing tribal system that regulates nearly all aspects of Pashtun life ranging from community to personal level. One of the better known tenets is Melmastyā́, hospitality and asylum to all guests seeking help. Perceived injustice calls for Badál, swift revenge. Many aspects promote peaceful co-existence, such as Nənawā́te, the humble admission of guilt for a wrong committed, which should result in automatic forgiveness from the wronged party. These and other basic precepts of Pashtunwali continue to be followed by many Pashtuns, especially in rural areas.

Another prominent Pashtun institution is the lóya jirgá or 'grand council' of elected elders. Most decisions in tribal life are made by members of the jirgá, which has been the main institution of authority that the largely egalitarian Pashtuns willingly acknowledge as a viable governing body.

Islam 

The overwhelming majority of Pashtuns adhere to Sunni Islam and belong to the Hanafi school of thought. Small Shia communities exist in Khyber Pakhtunkhwa and Paktia. The Shias belong to the Turi tribe while the Bangash tribe is approximately 50% Shia and the rest Sunni, who are mainly found in and around Parachinar, Kurram, Hangu, Kohat and Orakzai.

A legacy of Sufi activity may be found in some Pashtun regions, especially in Khyber Pakhtunkhwa, as evident in songs and dances. Many Pashtuns are prominent Ulema, Islamic scholars, such as Maulana Aazam an author of more than five hundred books including Tafasee of the Quran as Naqeeb Ut Tafaseer, Tafseer Ul Aazamain, Tafseer e Naqeebi and Noor Ut Tafaseer etc., as well as Muhammad Muhsin Khan who has helped translate the Noble Quran, Sahih Al-Bukhari and many other books to the English language. A number of Pashtuns are involved in Dawah activities in the United States. One of them is Sheikh Uthman Ibn Farooq, who belongs to the Yusufzai Pashtun tribe. Jamal-al-Din al-Afghani was a 19th-century Islamic ideologist and one of the founders of Islamic modernism. Although his ethnicity is disputed by some, he is widely accepted in the Afghanistan-Pakistan region as well as in the Arab world, as a Pashtun from the Kunar Province of Afghanistan. Like other non Arabic-speaking Muslims, many Pashtuns are able to read the Quran but not understand the Arabic language implicit in the holy text itself. Translations, especially in English, are scarcely understood or distributed. This paradox has contributed to the spread of different versions of religious practices and Wahabism, as well as political Islamism (including movements such as the Taliban) having a key presence in Pashtun society. In order to counter radicalization, the United States began spreading its influence in Pashtun areas. Many Pashtuns want to reclaim their identity from being lumped in with the Taliban and international terrorism, which is not directly linked with Pashtun culture and history.

Lastly, little information is available on non-Muslim as there is limited data regarding irreligious groups and minorities, especially since many of the Hindu and Sikh Pashtuns migrated from Khyber Pakhtunkhwa after the partition of India and later, after the rise of the Taliban.

There are also Hindu Pashtuns, sometimes known as the Sheen Khalai, who have moved predominantly to India. A small Pashtun Hindu community, known as the Sheen Khalai meaning 'blue skinned' (referring to the color of Pashtun women's facial tattoos), migrated to Unniara, Rajasthan, India after partition. Prior to 1947, the community resided in the Quetta, Loralai and Maikhter regions of the British Indian province of Baluchistan. They are mainly members of the Pashtun Kakar tribe. Today, they continue to speak Pashto and celebrate Pashtun culture through the Attan dance.

There is also a minority of Pashtun Sikhs in Tirah, Orakzai, Kurram, Malakand, and Swat. Due to the ongoing insurgency in Khyber Pakhtunkhwa, some Pashtun Sikhs were internally displaced from their ancestral villages to settle in cities like Peshawar and Nankana Sahib.

Pashto literature and poetry 

The majority of Pashtuns use Pashto as their native tongue, believed to belong to the Indo-Iranian language family, and is spoken by up to 60 million people. It is written in the Pashto-Arabic script and is divided into two main dialects, the southern "Pashto" and the northern "Pukhto". The language has ancient origins and bears similarities to extinct languages such as Avestan and Bactrian. Its closest modern relatives may include Pamir languages, such as Shughni and Wakhi, and Ossetic. Pashto may have ancient legacy of borrowing vocabulary from neighbouring languages including such as Persian and Vedic Sanskrit. Modern borrowings come primarily from the English language.

Fluency in Pashto is often the main determinant of group acceptance as to who is considered a Pashtun. Pashtun nationalism emerged following the rise of Pashto poetry that linked language and ethnic identity. Pashto has national status in Afghanistan and regional status in neighboring Pakistan. In addition to their native tongue, many Pashtuns are fluent in Persian, English and Urdu. Throughout their history, poets, prophets, kings and warriors have been among the most revered members of Pashtun society. Early written records of Pashto began to appear around the 16th century.

The earliest describes Sheikh Mali's conquest of Swat. Pir Roshan is believed to have written a number of Pashto books while fighting with the Mughals. Pashtun scholars such as Abdul Hai Habibi and others believe that the earliest Pashto work dates back to Amir Kror Suri, and they use the writings found in Pata Khazana as proof. Amir Kror Suri, son of Amir Polad Suri, was an 8th-century folk hero and king from the Ghor region in Afghanistan. However, this is disputed by several European experts due to lack of strong evidence.

The advent of poetry helped transition Pashto to the modern period. Pashto literature gained significant prominence in the 20th century, with poetry by Ameer Hamza Shinwari who developed Pashto Ghazals. In 1919, during the expanding of mass media, Mahmud Tarzi published Seraj-al-Akhbar, which became the first Pashto newspaper in Afghanistan. In 1977, Khan Roshan Khan wrote Tawarikh-e-Hafiz Rehmatkhani which contains the family trees and Pashtun tribal names. Some notable poets include Abdul Ghani Khan, Afzal Khan Khattak, Ahmad Shah Durrani, Ajmal Khattak, Ghulam Muhammad Tarzi, Hamza Shinwari, Hanif Baktash, Khushal Khan Khattak, Nazo Tokhi, Pareshan Khattak, Rahman Baba, Shuja Shah Durrani, and Timur Shah Durrani.

Recently, Pashto literature has received increased patronage, but many Pashtuns continue to rely on oral tradition due to relatively low literacy rates and education. Pashtun society is also marked by some matriarchal tendencies. Folktales involving reverence for Pashtun mothers and matriarchs are common and are passed down from parent to child, as is most Pashtun heritage, through a rich oral tradition that has survived the ravages of time.

Media and arts 

Pashto media has expanded in the last decade, with a number of Pashto TV channels becoming available. Two of the popular ones are the Pakistan-based AVT Khyber and Pashto One. Pashtuns around the world, particularly those in Arab countries, watch these for entertainment purposes and to get latest news about their native areas. Others are Afghanistan-based Shamshad TV, Radio Television Afghanistan, and Lemar TV, which has a special children's show called Baghch-e-Simsim. International news sources that provide Pashto programs include BBC Pashto and Voice of America.

Producers based in Peshawar have created Pashto-language films since the 1970s.

Pashtun performers remain avid participants in various physical forms of expression including dance, sword fighting, and other physical feats. Perhaps the most common form of artistic expression can be seen in the various forms of Pashtun dances. One of the most prominent dances is Attan, which has ancient roots. A rigorous exercise, Attan is performed as musicians play various native instruments including the dhol (drums), tablas (percussions), rubab (a bowed string instrument), and toola (wooden flute). With a rapid circular motion, dancers perform until no one is left dancing, similar to Sufi whirling dervishes. Numerous other dances are affiliated with various tribes notably from Pakistan including the Khattak Wal Atanrh (eponymously named after the Khattak tribe), Mahsood Wal Atanrh (which, in modern times, involves the juggling of loaded rifles), and Waziro Atanrh among others. A sub-type of the Khattak Wal Atanrh known as the Braghoni involves the use of up to three swords and requires great skill. Young women and girls often entertain at weddings with the Tumbal (Dayereh) which is an instrument.

Sports 

Both the Afghanistan national cricket team and the Pakistan national cricket team have Pashtun players. One of the most popular sports among Pashtuns is cricket, which was introduced to South Asia during the early 18th century with the arrival of the British. Many Pashtuns have become prominent international cricketers, including Imran Khan, Shahid Afridi, Majid Khan, Misbah-ul-Haq, Younis Khan, Umar Gul, Junaid Khan, Fakhar Zaman, Mohammad Rizwan, Usman Shinwari, Naseem Shah, Shaheen Afridi, Iftikhar Ahmed, Mohammad Wasim and Yasir Shah. Australian cricketer Fawad Ahmed is of Pakistani Pashtun origin who has played for the Australian national team.

Football (soccer) is also one of the most popular sports among Pashtuns. The former captain and now the current assistant coach of the Pakistan national football team, Muhammad Essa, is an ethnic Pashtun. Other sports popular among Pashtuns may include polo, field hockey, volleyball, handball, basketball, golf, track and field, bodybuilding, weightlifting, wrestling, kayaking, horse racing, martial arts, boxing, taekwondo, kick boxing, skateboarding, bowling and chess.

Jahangir Khan and Jansher Khan became professional squash players. Although now retired, they are engaged in promoting the sport through the Pakistan Squash Federation. Maria Toorpakai Wazir is the first female Pashtun squash player. Pakistan also produced other world champions of Pashtun origin: Hashim Khan, Roshan Khan, Azam Khan, Mo Khan and Qamar Zaman.In recent decades Hayatullah Khan Durrani, Pride of Performance legendary caver from Quetta, has been promoting mountaineering, rock climbing and Caving in Balochistan, Pakistan. Mohammad Abubakar Durrani International Canoeing shining star of Pakistan.

Snooker and billiards are played by young Pashtun men, mainly in urban areas where snooker clubs are found. Several prominent international recognized snooker players are from the Pashtun area, including Saleh Mohammed. Although traditionally very less involved in sports than boys, Pashtun girls sometimes play volleyball, basketball, football, and cricket, especially in urban areas.

Makha is a traditional archery sport in Khyber Pakhtunkhwa, played with a long arrow (gheshai) having a saucer shaped metallic plate at its distal end, and a long bow. In Afghanistan, some Pashtuns still participate in the ancient sport of buzkashi in which horse riders attempt to place a goat or calf carcass in a goal circle.

Women 

In Pashtun society there are three levels of women's leadership and legislative authority: the national level, the village level, and the family level. The national level includes women such as Nazo Tokhi, Zarghona Anaa and Malalai of Maiwand. Tokhi was a 17th-century Pashto poet who eventually became the "Mother of Afghan Nationalism" after gaining authority through her poetry and adhering to Pashtunwali. She used Pashtunwali to unite Pashtuns against the Safavids. Her cause was picked up in the early 18th century by Zarghona Anaa.

The lives of Pashtun women vary from those who reside in the ultra-conservative rural areas to those found in urban centres. At the village level, the female village leader is called "qaryadar". Her duties may include witnessing women's ceremonies, mobilising women to practice religious festivals, preparing the female dead for burial, and performing services for deceased women. She also arranges marriages for her own family and arbitrates conflicts for men and women. Though many Pashtun women remain tribal and illiterate, some have completed universities and joined the regular employment world.

The decades of war and the rise of the Taliban caused considerable hardship among Pashtun women, as many of their rights have been curtailed by a rigid interpretation of Islamic law. The difficult lives of Afghan female refugees gained considerable notoriety with the iconic image Afghan Girl (Sharbat Gula) depicted on the June 1985 cover of National Geographic magazine.

Modern social reform for Pashtun women began in the early 20th century, when Queen Soraya Tarzi of Afghanistan made rapid reforms to improve women's lives and their position in the family. She was the only woman to appear on the list of rulers in Afghanistan. Credited with having been one of the first and most powerful Afghan and Muslim female activists. Her advocacy of social reforms for women led to a protest and contributed to the ultimate demise of King Amanullah's reign in 1929. In 1942, Madhubala (Mumtaz Jehan), the Marilyn Monroe of India, entered the Bollywood film industry. Bollywood blockbusters of the 1970s and 1980s starred Parveen Babi, who hailed from the lineage of Gujarat's historical Pathan community: the royal Babi Dynasty. Other Indian actresses and models, such as Zarine Khan, continue to work in the industry. Civil rights remained an important issue during the 1970s, as feminist leader Meena Keshwar Kamal campaigned for women's rights and founded the Revolutionary Association of the Women of Afghanistan (RAWA) in the 1977.

Pashtun women these days vary from the traditional housewives who live in seclusion to urban workers, some of whom seek or have attained parity with men. But due to numerous social hurdles, the literacy rate remains considerably lower for them than for males. Abuse against women is present and increasingly being challenged by women's rights organisations which find themselves struggling with conservative religious groups as well as government officials in both Pakistan and Afghanistan. According to a 1992 book, "a powerful ethic of forbearance severely limits the ability of traditional Pashtun women to mitigate the suffering they acknowledge in their lives."

Despite obstacles, many Pashtun women have begun a process of slow change. A rich oral tradition and resurgence of poetry has inspired many Pashtun women seeking to learn to read and write. Further challenging the status quo, Vida Samadzai was selected as Miss Afghanistan in 2003, a feat that was received with a mixture of support from those who back the individual rights of women and those who view such displays as anti-traditionalist and un-Islamic. Some have attained political office in Afghanistan and Pakistan. A number of Pashtun women are found as TV hosts, journalists and actors. Nigar Johar is a three-star general in the Pakistan Army. Khatol Mohammadzai served as brigadier general in the Afghan Army, another Pashtun female became a fighter pilot in the Pakistan Air Force. Some other notable Pashtun women include Aisha Uqbah Malik, Armeena Khan, Fauzia Gailani, Ghazala Javed, Gulalai Ismail, Gul Panra, Humaira Begum, Laila Khan, Malala Yousafzai, Naghma, Najiba Faiz, Nilofar Bakhtiar, Sana Safi, Bushra Gohar, Shinkai Karokhail, Shukria Barakzai, Suhaila Seddiqi, Tabassum Adnan, Zartaj Gul, Zeenat Karzai, Marina Khan, Neelum Muneer and Mahira Khan.

Pashtun women often have their legal rights curtailed in favour of their husbands or male relatives. For example, though women are officially allowed to vote in Afghanistan and Pakistan, some have been kept away from ballot boxes by males. Another tradition that persists is swara (a form of child marriage), which was declared illegal in Pakistan in 2000 but continues in some parts. Substantial work remains for Pashtun women to gain equal rights with men, who remain disproportionately dominant in most aspects of Pashtun society. Human rights organisations continue to struggle for greater women's rights, such as the Afghan Women's Network and the Aurat Foundation in Pakistan which aims to protect women from domestic violence.

Notable people
 Ahmad Shah Durrani, founder of the Durrani Empire. Defeated the Maratha Empire at the Third Battle of Panipat. He is considered to be the founder of modern-day Afghanistan.
 Bahlul Lodi, founder and 15th century ruler of the Lodi dynasty.
 Azad Shah Afghan, military commander famous for conquering parts of Central and Western Iran, as well as Kurdistan and Gilan.
 Mirwais Hotak, revolted against Safavid Iran and established the Hotak dynasty.
 Mahmud Hotak, second ruler of the Hotaki dynasty and Shah of Persia. He Invaded Persia and overthrew the Safavid dynasty.
 Sher Shah Suri, founder and 16th century ruler of the Sur Empire. Defeated the Mughal Empire at the Battle of Chausa.
 Timur Shah Durrani, second ruler of the Durrani Empire, defeated Sikhs and took back Multan.
 Malalai of Maiwand, national folk hero of Afghanistan. Rallied Pashtun fighters to defeat the British during the Second Anglo-Afghan war
 
 Ibrahim Lodi, last Sultan of the Delhi Sultanate.
 Abdul Ahad Momand, first Afghan cosmonaut and 4th Muslim to go outer space. He made Pashto the 4th language spoken in space.
 Khan Abdul Ghaffar Khan, independence activist against British rule in India, known as "Badshah Khan", "Bacha Khan", and "Frontier Gandhi."
 Abdul Ghafoor Breshna, painter, music composer, poet and film director. He is the artist behind the painting 1747 coronation of Ahmad Shah Durrani, sketch of Sher Shah Suri and the Afghan national anthem of the Republic of Afghanistan.
 Sikandar Lodi, Sultan of the Lodi dynasty. He gained control of Bihar and founded the modern city of Agra.
 Nāzo Tokhī, Pashto poetess, writer and woman warrior. She was the mother Afghan king Mirwais Hotak, founder of Hotak dynasty.
 Abdul Ghani Khan, philosopher, poet, artist, writer and politician.
 
 Ahmad Zahir, Afghan singer dubbed the "Elvis of Afghanistan". He sang mostly in Persian, albeit he also made many songs in Pashto, Russian, English and Urdu.
 Amanullah Khan, King of Afghanistan in early 20th century.
 Mohammad Ashraf Ghani, President of Afghanistan from 2014 to 2021.
 Ayub Khan, military general who served as the second President of Pakistan.
 Imran Khan, Pakistani cricketer turned politician who served as the 22nd Prime Minister of Pakistan.
 Pir Roshan, warrior, poet, Sufi and revolutionary leader. Created the first known Pashto alphabet. He's also the founder of the Roshani movement/the enlightened movement.
 Hafizullah Amin, Afghan politician.
 Hamid Karzai, head of the Popalzai tribe and served as President of Afghanistan from 2001 to 2014.
 Hamza Shinwari, prominent Pashto & Urdu poet. He is considered a bridge between classic Pashto literature and modern literature.
 Josh Malihabadi, prominent Urdu language poet of British Indian era.
 Khalilullah Khalili, Pashtun poet of the Persian language.
 Khushal Khan Khattak, warrior and Pashto poet.
 Madhubala, Indian film actress, known as the "Marilyn Monroe of Bollywood".
 Mirwais Azizi, prominent Afghan entrepreneur (possibly the richest person in Afghanistan).
 Malala Yousafzai, Pakistani female education activist, awarded the 2014 Nobel Peace Prize at age 17, the first Pashtun to receive a Nobel Prize.
 Mirza Mazhar Jan-e-Janaan, renowned Hanafi Maturidi Naqshbandi Sufi poet, distinguished as one of the "four pillars of Urdu poetry".
 Wazir Akbar Khan, Afghan prince, general and emir. Famous for his role in the First Anglo-Afghan War, particularly for the massacre of Elphinstone's army.
 Karnal Sher Khan, Pakistani military captain and recipient of Nishan-e-Haider for his role in the Kargil War, one of the only eleven holders of the highest military award.
 Mohammad Najibullah, Afghan politician.
 Mohammed Daoud Khan, Afghan politician.
 Yahya Khan, military general who served as the third President of Pakistan.
 Mohammed Zahir Shah, last king of Afghanistan.
 Ahmed Faraz, renowned Urdu poet, scriptwriter and lecturer.
 Rahman Baba, Pashto poet and Sufi Dervish.
 Sartaj Aziz, Pakistani economist, strategist, senator, former deputy chairman of the Planning Commission, Minister for Foreign Affairs, as well as the National Security Advisor.
 Rashid Khan, Afghan cricketer.
 Shaheen Afridi, Pakistani cricketer.
 Shahid Afridi, Pakistani cricketer.
 Jahangir Khan, Pakistani squash player.
 Jansher Khan, Pakistani squash player.
 Fawad Khan, Pakistani actor, producer, screenwriter, and model.
 Sharbat Gula, subject of notable 1985 cover photograph of Afghan Girl on National Geographic magazine.

Explanatory notes 

 Note: population statistics for Pashtuns (including those without a notation) in foreign countries were derived from various census counts, the UN, the CIA's The World Factbook and Ethnologue.

References

 Further reading 

 Ahmad, Aisha and Boase, Roger. 2003. "Pashtun Tales from the Pakistan-Afghan Frontier: From the Pakistan-Afghan Frontier." Saqi Books (1 March 2003). .
 Ahmad, Jamil. 2012. "The Wandering Falcon." Riverhead Trade. . A loosely connected collection of short stories focused on life in the Pashtun tribal regions.
 Ahmed, Akbar S. 1976. "Millennium and Charisma among Pathans: A Critical Essay in Social Anthropology." London: Routledge & Kegan Paul.
 Ahmed, Akbar S. 1980. "Pukhtun economy and society." London: Routledge and Kegan Paul.
 Banuazizi, Ali and Myron Weiner (eds.). 1994. "The Politics of Social Transformation in Afghanistan, Iran, and Pakistan (Contemporary Issues in the Middle East)." Syracuse University Press. .
 Banuazizi, Ali and Myron Weiner (eds.). 1988. "The State, Religion, and Ethnic Politics: Afghanistan, Iran, and Pakistan (Contemporary Issues in the Middle East)." Syracuse University Press. .
 
 Caroe, Olaf. 1984. The Pathans: 500 B.C.-A.D. 1957'' (Oxford in Asia Historical Reprints). Oxford University Press. .
 Dani, Ahmad Hasan. 1985. "Peshawar: Historic city of the Frontier." Sang-e-Meel Publications (1995). .
 Docherty, Paddy. The Khyber Pass: A History of Empire and Invasion: A History of Invasion and Empire. 2007. Faber and Faber. . The Khyber Pass: A History of Empire and Invasion
 Dupree, Louis. 1997. "Afghanistan." Oxford University Press. .
 Elphinstone, Mountstuart. 1815. "An account of the Kingdom of Caubul and its dependencies in Persia, Tartary, and India: comprising a view of the Afghaun nation." Akadem. Druck- u. Verlagsanst (1969). online version.
 
 Habibi, Abdul Hai. 2003. "Afghanistan: An Abridged History." Fenestra Books. .
 Hopkirk, Peter. 1984. "The Great Game: The Struggle for Empire in Central Asia" Kodansha Globe; Reprint edition. .
 Spain, James W. (1962; 2nd edition 1972). "The Way Of The Pathans." Oxford University Press. .
 Wardak, Ali "Jirga – A Traditional Mechanism of Conflict Resolution in Afghanistan" , 2003, online at UNPAN (the United Nations Online Network in Public Administration and Finance).

Social groups of Khyber Pakhtunkhwa
Social groups of Balochistan, Pakistan
Ethnic groups in Pakistan
Ethnic groups in Afghanistan
Ethnic groups in India
Iranian ethnic groups
Ethnic groups divided by international borders
Pashtun people
Ethnic groups in South Asia